Rathangan may refer to:

Rathangan, County Kildare
Rathangan, County Wexford